Finland participated in the Eurovision Song Contest 1994 with the song "Bye Bye Baby" written by Kari Salli and Markku Lentonen. The song was performed by the duo CatCat. The Finnish broadcaster Yleisradio (Yle) organised the national final Euroviisut 1994 in order to select the Finnish entry for the 1994 contest in Dublin, Ireland. Ten entries were selected to compete in the national final on 5 March 1994 where votes from the public selected "Bye Bye Baby" performed by CatCat as the winner with 25,834 votes.

Finland competed in the Eurovision Song Contest which took place on 30 April 1994. Performing during the show in position 2, Finland placed twenty-second out of the 25 participating countries, scoring 11 points.

Background 

Prior to the 1994 contest, Finland had participated in the Eurovision Song Contest thirty-two times since its first entry in 1961. Finland's best result in the contest achieved in 1973 where the song "Tom Tom Tom" performed by Marion Rung placed sixth. The Finnish national broadcaster, Yleisradio (Yle), broadcasts the event within Finland and organises the selection process for the nation's entry. Finland's entries for the Eurovision Song Contest have been selected through national final competitions that have varied in format over the years. Since 1961, a selection show that was often titled Euroviisukarsinta highlighted that the purpose of the program was to select a song for Eurovision. The broadcaster selected the Finnish entry for the 1994 contest again through the Euroviisut selection show.

Before Eurovision

Euroviisut 1994 
Euroviisut 1994 was the national final that selected Finland's entry for the Eurovision Song Contest 1994. The competition consisted of a final on 5 March 1994, held at the Tampere Hall in Tampere and hosted by Jukka Laaksonen, Juha Laitila and Joonas Myllyveräjä. Ten entries selected for the competition from 470 submissions received during a submission period as well as from composers and music publishers directly invited by Yle competed and "Bye Bye Baby" performed by CatCat was selected as the winner based on the results from a public vote, which were revealed by Finland's five telephone regions along with the votes of the venue audience. In addition to the performances of the competing entries, the show was opened by Tarja Lunnas, while the interval act featured Jam and Spoon, Kaija Koo and Plavka. 119,322 votes were cast during the show, which was broadcast on Yle TV1 and watched by 1.17 million viewers in Finland. During the voting, it was discovered that the votes were incorrectly announced but were shortly amended following the competition.

At Eurovision
According to Eurovision rules, all nations with the exceptions of the bottom six countries in the 1993 contest competed in the final on 30 April 1994. Following the allocation draw which determined the running order, Finland was set to perform in position 2, following the entry from Sweden and before the entry from Ireland. The Finnish conductor at the contest was Olli Ahvenlahti, and Finland finished in twenty-second place with 11 points. 

The show was televised in Finland on Yle TV1 with commentary by Erkki Pohjanheimo and Kirsi-Maria Niemi. The Finnish spokesperson, who announced the Finnish votes during the final, was Solveig Herlin.

Voting 
Below is a breakdown of points awarded to Finland and awarded by Finland in the contest. The nation awarded its 12 points to Hungary in the qualifying round and to Estonia in the final.

References

External links
Finnish National Final 1994

1994
Countries in the Eurovision Song Contest 1994
Eurovision
Eurovision